Falcon Song is a 2014 Contemporary Western film written and directed by Jason Corgan Brown. It stars Rainey Qualley, Gabriel Sunday, and Martin Kove. The 1980s style film explores themes of land conservation and soul searching through a storybook world of quirky characters with touches of magical realism.

Plot 

A guitar playing drifter (Gabriel Sunday) helps a rancher's granddaughter (Rainey Qualley) find her true calling. They soon find themselves in the middle of a land war instigated by Cap Davenport (Martin Kove).

Cast 

 Rainey Qualley as Sarah Lou
 Gabriel Sunday as Syd
 Martin Kove as Caspian
 James Storm as Jabez
 Hart Turner as Randy
 Michael Yebba as "Monster"
 Jeter Rhodes as Frank

Release 

Falcon Song premiered at the 2014 Santa Barbara International Film Festival on 31 January. The film's US theatrical release began in Los Angeles on March 21, 2014. It subsequently screened across America at classic movie houses  as well as Alamo Drafthouse Cinemas.

On May 23, 2014 Falcon Song was released in North America on major Cable On Demand and Internet VOD platforms including AT&T U-Verse, Verizon, Comcast, Cox, Charter, iTunes, Vudu, Xbox Live, and PlayStation Network.

Reception 

Falcon Song received mostly positive reviews when it was initially released in 2014. Ernest Hardy of LA Weekly wrote that Falcon Song is "modest, charming, and relatively subversive in the context of contemporary American film." and that the movie is "mercifully free of easy irony".

Sheri Linden of the Los Angeles Times stated that "The Director achieves a desired retro aesthetic" and that "The story's wholesomeness could have tipped into bizarro David Lynch dreamland, but it remains grounded, more or less."

Ethan Stewart of The Santa Barbara Independent wrote that the film is "A tongue-in-cheek celebration of 1980s’ cinema, Jason Brown’s Falcon Song legitimately makes you feel like you have travelled through time. The film goes retro with everything from production techniques and the soundtrack to its storyline…".

In Film Threat's review by Mark Bell, the film is highlighted as "a throwback to a less cynical age of cinema".

References

External links 

 
 
 

2014 films
American Western (genre) films
Films set in the 1980s
Films shot in Montana
Western United States in fiction
2014 Western (genre) films
Neo-Western films
2010s English-language films
2010s American films